Thuraya Muhammad Qabil (sometimes spelt as 'Gabel') (born 1943) is a Saudi Arabian poet and journalist.
Qabil was born in Jeddah, and has a high school diploma.

With the issuance of The Weeping Rhythms in 1963, she became the first Saudi woman in the Hijaz to publish a poetry collection; she is one of a number of women from the region, including Fatna Shakir, Abdiya Khayyat, and Huda Dabbagh, to become prominent in Saudi letters during the 1950s and 1960s. The collection was a success, and many of its poems became the basis for popular songs, but it remained her only book of verse.

Qabil has been active as a journalist, serving as chief editor of Zina magazine from 1986 until 1987 and working as an editor for the newspapers al-Bilad and 'Ukaz as well.

References

1943 births
Living people
People from Jeddah
Saudi Arabian journalists
Saudi Arabian women poets
Saudi Arabian women journalists
Women magazine editors
Women newspaper editors
20th-century journalists
20th-century Saudi Arabian poets
20th-century Saudi Arabian writers
20th-century Saudi Arabian women writers